Jorge Montt Island is an island in the Patagonian Archipelago in Magallanes y la Antártica Chilena Region, Chile. It has an area of 537 km2.

The island was named after Admiral Jorge Montt, President of Chile from 1891 until 1896.

External links
 United States Hydrographic Office, South America Pilot (1916)

Islands of Magallanes Region